Punishment, commonly, is the imposition of an undesirable or unpleasant outcome upon a group or individual, meted out by an authority—in contexts ranging from child discipline to criminal law—as a response and deterrent to a particular action or behavior that is deemed undesirable or unacceptable. It is, however, possible to distinguish between various different understandings of what punishment is.

The reasoning for punishment may be to condition a child to avoid self-endangerment, to impose social conformity (in particular, in the contexts of compulsory education or military discipline), to defend norms, to protect against future harms (in particular, those from violent crime), and to maintain the law—and respect for rule of law—under which the social group is governed.  Punishment may be self-inflicted as with self-flagellation and mortification of the flesh in the religious setting, but is most often a form of social coercion.

The unpleasant imposition may include a fine, penalty, or confinement, or be the removal or denial of something pleasant or desirable.  The individual may be a person, or even an animal. The authority may be either a group or a single person, and punishment may be carried out formally under a system of law or informally in other kinds of social settings such as within a family. Negative consequences that are not authorized or that are administered without a breach of rules are not considered to be punishment as defined here. The study and practice of the punishment of crimes, particularly as it applies to imprisonment, is called penology, or, often in modern texts, corrections; in this context, the punishment process is euphemistically called "correctional process". Research into punishment often includes similar research into prevention.

Justifications for punishment include retribution, deterrence, rehabilitation, and incapacitation. The last could include such measures as isolation, in order to prevent the wrongdoer's having contact with potential victims, or the removal of a hand in order to make theft more difficult.

If only some of the conditions included in the definition of punishment are present, descriptions other than "punishment" may be considered more accurate. Inflicting something negative, or unpleasant, on a person or animal, without authority or not on the basis of a breach of rules is typically considered only revenge or spite rather than punishment. In addition, the word "punishment" is used as a metaphor, as when a boxer experiences "punishment" during a fight. In other situations, breaking a rule may be rewarded, and so receiving such a reward naturally does not constitute punishment. Finally the condition of breaking (or breaching) the rules must be satisfied for consequences to be considered punishment.

Punishments differ in their degree of severity, and may include sanctions such as reprimands, deprivations of privileges or liberty, fines, incarcerations, ostracism, the infliction of pain, amputation and the death penalty.
Corporal punishment refers to punishments in which physical pain is intended to be inflicted upon the transgressor.
Punishments may be judged as fair or unfair in terms of their degree of reciprocity and proportionality to the offense.
Punishment can be an integral part of socialization, and punishing unwanted behavior is often part of a system of pedagogy or behavioral modification which also includes rewards.

Definitions

There are a large number of different understandings of what punishment is.

In philosophy
Various philosophers have presented definitions of punishment. Conditions commonly considered necessary properly to describe an action as punishment are that
 it is imposed by an authority (single or multiple),
 it involves some loss to the supposed offender,
 it is in response to an offense and
 the human (or other animal) to whom the loss is imposed should be deemed at least somewhat responsible for the offense.

In psychology

Introduced by B.F. Skinner, punishment has a more restrictive and technical definition.  Along with reinforcement it belongs under the operant conditioning category.  Operant conditioning refers to learning with either punishment (often confused as negative reinforcement) or a reward that serves as a positive reinforcement of the lesson to be learned. In psychology, punishment is the reduction of a behavior via application of an unpleasant stimulus ("positive punishment") or removal of a pleasant stimulus ("negative punishment"). Extra chores or spanking are examples of positive punishment, while removing an offending student's recess or play privileges are examples of negative punishment. The definition requires that punishment is only determined after the fact by the reduction in behavior; if the offending behavior of the subject does not decrease, it is not considered punishment.  There is some conflation of punishment and aversives, though an aversion that does not decrease behavior is not considered punishment in psychology. Additionally, "aversive stimulus" is a label behaviorists generally apply to negative reinforcers (as in avoidance learning), rather than the punishers.

In socio-biology
Punishment is sometimes called retaliatory or moralistic aggression; it has been observed in all species of social animals, leading evolutionary biologists to conclude that it is an evolutionarily stable strategy, selected because it favors cooperative behavior.

Examples against sociobiological use
One criticism of the claim of all social animals being evolutionarily hardwired for punishment comes from studies of animals, such as the octopuses near Capri, Italy that suddenly formed communal cultures from having, until then lived solitary lives.  During a period of heavy fishing and tourism that encroached on their territory, they started to live in groups, learning from each other, especially hunting techniques.  Small, younger octopuses could be near the fully grown octopuses without being eaten by them, even though they, like other Octopus vulgaris, were cannibals until just before the group formation. The authors stress that this behavior change happened too fast to be a genetic characteristic in the octopuses, and that there were certainly no mammals or other "naturally" social animals punishing octopuses for cannibalism involved. The authors also note that the octopuses adopted observational learning without any evolutionary history of specialized adaptation for it.

There are also arguments against the notion of punishment requiring intelligence, based on studies of punishment in very small-brained animals such as insects. There is proof of honey bee workers with mutations that makes them fertile laying eggs only when other honey bees are not observing them, and that the few that are caught in the act are killed. This is corroborated by computer simulations proving that a few simple reactions well within mainstream views of the extremely limited intelligence of insects are sufficient to emulate the "political" behavior observed in great apes. The authors argue that this falsifies the claim that punishment evolved as a strategy to deal with individuals capable of knowing what they are doing.

In the case of more complex brains, the notion of evolution selecting for specific punishment of intentionally chosen breaches of rules and/or wrongdoers capable of intentional choices (for example, punishing humans for murder while not punishing lethal viruses) is subject to criticism from coevolution issues. That punishment of individuals with certain characteristics (including but, in principle, not restricted to mental abilities) selects against those characteristics, making evolution of any mental abilities considered to be the basis for penal responsibility impossible in populations subject to such selective punishment. Certain scientists argue that this disproves the notion of humans having a biological feeling of intentional transgressions deserving to be punished.

Scope of application
Punishments are applied for various purposes, most generally, to encourage and enforce proper behavior as defined by society or family. Criminals are punished judicially, by fines, corporal punishment or custodial sentences such as prison; detainees risk further punishments for breaches of internal rules. Children, pupils and other trainees may be punished by their educators or instructors (mainly parents, guardians, or teachers, tutors and coaches)—see Child discipline.

Slaves, domestic and other servants are subject to punishment by their masters. Employees can still be subject to a contractual form of fine or demotion. Most hierarchical organizations, such as military and police forces, or even churches, still apply quite rigid internal discipline, even with a judicial system of their own (court martial, canonical courts).

Punishment may also be applied on moral, especially religious, grounds, as in penance (which is voluntary) or imposed in a theocracy with a religious police (as in a strict Islamic state like Iran or under the Taliban) or (though not a true theocracy) by Inquisition.

Hell as punishment
Belief that an individual's ultimate punishment is being sent by God, the highest authority, to an existence in Hell, a place believed to exist in the after-life, typically corresponds to sins committed during their life. Sometimes these distinctions are specific, with damned souls suffering for each sin committed (see for example Plato's myth of Er or Dante's The Divine Comedy), but sometimes they are general, with condemned sinners relegated to one or more chamber of Hell or to a level of suffering.

History and rationale

Seriousness of a crime; Punishment that fits the crime 

A principle often mentioned with respect to the degree of punishment to be meted out is that the punishment should match the crime.
One standard for measurement is the degree to which a crime affects others or society. Measurements of the degree of seriousness of a crime have been developed.
A felony is generally considered to be a crime of "high seriousness", while a misdemeanor is not.

Possible reasons for punishment

There are many possible reasons that might be given to justify or explain why someone ought to be punished; here follows a broad outline of typical, possibly conflicting, justifications.

Deterrence 
Two reasons given to justify punishment is that it is a measure to prevent people from committing an offence - deterring previous offenders from re-offending, and preventing those who may be contemplating an offence they have not committed from actually committing it.  This punishment is intended to be sufficient that people would choose not to commit the crime rather than experience the punishment.  The aim is to deter everyone in the community from committing offences.

Some criminologists state that the number of people convicted for crime does not decrease as a result of more severe punishment and conclude that deterrence is ineffective. Other criminologists object to said conclusion, citing that while most people do not know the exact severity of punishment such as whether the sentence for murder is 40 years or life, most people still know the rough outlines such as the punishments for armed robbery or forcible rape being more severe than the punishments for driving too fast or misparking a car. These criminologists therefore argue that lack of deterring effect of increasing the sentences for already severely punished crimes say nothing about the significance of the existence of punishment as a deterring factor.

Some criminologists argue that increasing the sentences for crimes can cause criminal investigators to give higher priority to said crimes so that a higher percentage of those committing them are convicted for them, causing statistics to give a false appearance of such crimes increasing. These criminologists argue that the use of statistics to gauge the efficiency of crime fighting methods are a danger of creating a reward hack that makes the least efficient criminal justice systems appear to be best at fighting crime, and that the appearance of deterrence being ineffective may be an example of this.

Rehabilitation 

Some punishment includes work to reform and rehabilitate the culprit so that they will not commit the offence again. This is distinguished from deterrence, in that the goal here is to change the offender's attitude to what they have done, and make them come to see that their behavior was wrong.

Incapacitation 

Incapacitation as a justification of punishment refers to the offender's ability to commit further offences being removed. Imprisonment separates offenders from the community, for example, Australia was a dumping ground for early British criminals. This was their way of removing or reducing the offenders ability to carry out certain crimes. The death penalty does this in a permanent (and irrevocable) way. In some societies, people who stole have been punished by having their hands amputated.

Retribution 

Criminal activities typically give a benefit to the offender and a loss to the victim. Punishment has been justified as a measure of retributive justice, in which the goal is to try to rebalance any unjust advantage gained by ensuring that the offender also suffers a loss. Sometimes viewed as a way of "getting even" with a wrongdoer—the suffering of the wrongdoer is seen as a desired goal in itself, even if it has no restorative benefits for the victim. One reason societies have administered punishments is to diminish the perceived need for retaliatory "street justice", blood feud, and vigilantism.

Restoration 

Especially applied to minor offenses, punishment may take the form of the offender "righting the wrong", or making restitution to the victim. Community service or compensation orders are examples of this sort of penalty.  In models of restorative justice, victims take an active role in a process with their offenders who are encouraged to take responsibility for their actions, "to repair the harm they've done—by apologizing, returning stolen money, or community service."  The restorative justice approach aims to help the offender want to avoid future offences.

Education and denunciation 

Punishment can be explained by positive prevention theory to use the criminal justice system to teach people what are the social norms for what is correct, and acts as a reinforcement.

Punishment can serve as a means for society to publicly express denunciation of an action as being criminal. Besides educating people regarding what is not acceptable behavior, it serves the dual function of preventing vigilante justice by acknowledging public anger, while concurrently deterring future criminal activity by stigmatizing the offender.
This is sometimes called the "Expressive Theory" of denunciation.
The pillory was a method for carrying out public denunciation.

Some critics of the education and denunciation model cite evolutionary problems with the notion that a feeling for punishment as a social signal system evolved if punishment was not effective. The critics argue that some individuals spending time and energy and taking risks in punishing others, and the possible loss of the punished group members, would have been selected against if punishment served no function other than signals that could evolve to work by less risky means.

Unified theory 
A unified theory of punishment brings together multiple penal purposes—such as retribution, deterrence and rehabilitation—in a single, coherent framework. Instead of punishment requiring we choose between them, unified theorists argue that they work together as part of some wider goal such as the protection of rights.

Criticism
Some people think that punishment as a whole is unhelpful and even harmful to the people that it is used against. Detractors argue that punishment is simply wrong, of the same design as "two wrongs make a right". Critics argue that punishment is simply revenge. Professor Deirdre Golash,  author of The Case against Punishment: Retribution, Crime Prevention, and the Law, says:
 Golash also writes  about imprisonment:

Destructiveness to thinking and betterment 
There are critics of punishment who argue that punishment aimed at intentional actions forces people to suppress their ability to act on intent. Advocates of this viewpoint argue that such suppression of intention causes the harmful behaviors to remain, making punishment counterproductive. These people suggest that the ability to make intentional choices should instead be treasured as a source of possibilities of betterment, citing that complex cognition would have been an evolutionarily useless waste of energy if it led to justifications of fixed actions and no change as simple inability to understand arguments would have been the most thrifty protection from being misled by them if arguments were for social manipulation, and reject condemnation of people who intentionally did bad things. Punishment can be effective in stopping undesirable employee behaviors such as tardiness, absenteeism or substandard work performance. However, punishment does not necessarily cause an employee to demonstrate a desirable behavior.

See also

Citations

References
 
 Stanford Encyclopedia of Philosophy – Punishment
 Stanford Encyclopedia of Philosophy – Legal Punishment
 Etymology Online

External links 

 
 

 
 
Social philosophy
Criminal justice